The 1st Zee Cine Awards ceremony honouring the winners and nominees of the best of Bollywood cinema films released in 1997. The ceremony was held on 14 March 1998 in Mumbai.

Dil To Pagal Hai led the ceremony with 27 nominations, followed by Border and Pardes with 19 nominations and Ishq with 10 nominations.

Dil To Pagal Hai won 10 awards, including Best Film, Best Actor (for Shah Rukh Khan), Best Actress (for Madhuri Dixit) and Best Supporting Actress (for Karisma Kapoor), thus becoming the most-awarded film at the ceremony.

Main Awards 
The winners and nominees have been listed below:

Special Awards

Superlatives

Presenters

References

Sources

 Zee Cine awards
 YouTube
 Awards and Shows

External links
 Official site 
 Vogue

Zee Cine Awards
1998 Indian film awards